Salma is a genus of snout moths. It was described by Francis Walker in 1863.

Species
In alphabetical order:
Salma apicalis (Kenrick, 1907)
Salma basiochra (Turner, 1937)
Salma cholica (Meyrick, 1884)
Salma cletolis (Turner, 1905)
Salma ebenina (Turner, 1904)
Salma eupepla (Turner, 1915)
Salma galeata (Hampson, 1906)
Salma glyceropa (Turner, 1937)
Salma hicanodes (Turner, 1937)
Salma marmorea (Warren, 1891)
Salma mnesibrya (Meyrick, 1884)
Salma nephelodes (Turner, 1933)
Salma nubilalis (Hampson, 1893)
Salma peloscia (Turner, 1913)
Salma pentabela (Turner, 1915)
Salma peratophaea (Turner, 1937)
Salma poliophanes (Turner, 1913)
Salma pyrastis (Meyrick, 1887)
Salma recurvalis Walker, 1863
Salma streptomela (Lower, 1896)
Salma syrichtusalis (Walker, [1859])
Salma tholoessa (Turner, 1926)
Salma validalis (Walker, [1866])

References

Epipaschiinae
Pyralidae genera